Culin may refer to:
 Culin, Isère, a commune in France
 Curtis G. Culin (1915–1963), American soldier and inventor
 Stewart Culin (1858–1929), American ethnographer and author

See also 
 Cullin, a family of proteins
 Cuillin, a mountain range in Scotland
 Culine, a village in Serbia
 Culen (disambiguation)
 Kulin (disambiguation)
 Qulin, a town in the United States